The Indigenous Curatorial Collective / Collectif des commissaires autochtones (IC/CA) (formerly the Aboriginal Curatorial Collective) is a Canadian-based fine arts organization that provides professional development opportunities to the Indigenous peoples in Canada which include, the First Nations, Inuit and Métis artists and curators.

History
Established by Cathy Mattes, Barry Ace, Ryan Rice, Ron Noganosh and Âhasiw Maskêgon-Iskwêw as a not-for-profit organization in 2006, the Collective's mandate is dedicated to increasing the public profile of Aboriginal art curators and their role in protecting, fostering and extending Aboriginal arts and culture throughout North America.

The Indigenous Curatorial Collective supports its mandate through sponsorship of an annual conference and other professional networking opportunities, including lectures and exhibitions. Caucuses are the main instrument through which members participate in the direction of the (IC/CA). Many of the central activities of the (IC/CA) will be determined by the priorities, participation and energy of caucuses. There is an extensive list of objects of the corporation. The establishment of caucuses by members around these objects will help determine their priority for (IC/CA) action. There are also other Aboriginal curatorial community issues that caucuses will address and that the (IC/CA) will put resources behind.  Prominent First Nation artists who belong to the Collective include Robert Houle, Greg A. Hill (artist), Jaimie Isaac, and Cheryl L'Hirondelle.

References

External links 
https://acc-cca.com/ Web site

Arts organizations based in Canada
Indigenous art in Canada
Organizations established in 2006